Geumho, Kumho, or Kǔmho may refer to:

 Kumho (South Hamgyong), North Korea
 Geumho River, Gyeongsangbuk-do, South Korea
 Geumho-eup, a town in Yeongcheon, North Gyeongsang, South Korea
 Geumho-dong, Seungdong-gu, Seoul, South Korea
 Geumho Station, Seoul Metro station in Geumho-dong, Seungdong-gu, Seoul, South Korea

Companies
 Kumho Asiana Group, a South Korean conglomerate
 Kumho Petrochemical and subsidiaries, a South Korean conglomerate spun off from the Kumho Asiana Group
 Kumho Tire, a South Korean tire manufacturer separated from Kumho Asiana Group after it was sold to Double Star in 2018